Ashes is a 2012 British thriller film directed by Mat Whitecross and starring Luke Evans, Jim Sturgess, Ray Winstone, Jodie Whittaker, Lesley Manville, and Zoe Telford.

Premise
Frank (Ray Winstone) is confined to a residential home, suffering from Alzheimer's with his past, present, and future slowly breaking down. One day, a young man named James (Jim Sturgess) visits, wanting to reconnect with a father who no longer remembers him. James breaks Frank out of the home and the pair go on the run together. As their spontaneous journey unfolds, the present combines with incomplete memories of the past, fact mixes with fiction, and it becomes apparent that nothing is quite what it seems.

Cast
 Luke Evans as JB
 Jim Sturgess as James
 Ray Winstone as Frank
 Jodie Whittaker as Ruth
 Lesley Manville as Cath
 Zoe Telford as Sophie

References

External links 
 

2012 films
2010s mystery thriller films
British mystery thriller films
Films about Alzheimer's disease
Films directed by Mat Whitecross
Films scored by Ilan Eshkeri
2010s English-language films
2010s British films